Christ Church is in Beech Street, off Todmorden Road, Bacup, Lancashire, England. It is a former Anglican parish church in the deanery of Rossendale, the archdeaconry of Bolton and the diocese of Manchester. The church is recorded in the National Heritage List for England as a designated Grade II listed building.

History

The church was built in 1854, and paid for from the legacy of a local manufacturer, James Heyworth. It was designed by the Lancaster firm of architects Sharpe and Paley. The church cost over £3,000 (equivalent to £ in ), and contained seating for 500 people. In 2012 it was decided that the church will close, and its congregation will share the premises of the Central Methodist Church.  Its last service was held on 26 August 2012, and it was thereafter closed.

Architecture

Exterior
Christ Church is constructed in sandstone rubble with a slate roof. Its architectural style is Gothic Revival. The plan consists of a southwest tower, a four-bay nave with north and south aisles, a porch, and a clerestory, and a two-bay chancel. The tower is in three stages and has diagonal buttresses rising halfway up the tower. At its southeast corner is a polygonal stair turret rising to a greater height than the tower and surmounted by a pinnacled lantern. It has a three-light west window in the lowest stage with smaller three-light windows in the middle stage on the west and south sides. The top stage contains two-light bell openings and at the top is a plain parapet. At the west end of the body of the church are triple two-light windows with a wheel window above them in the gable. At the east end is a triple lancet window.

Interior
The reredos is in stone with blind arcades, crockets, and images of faces. The pulpit is in a similar style. The church contains a pair of stained glass windows by Shrigley and Hunt.

Future
After 8 years of closure, the Church of England is currently in the process of selling the building, for the purpose of conversion into offices, to local digital marketing agency GrowTraffic.

See also

Listed buildings in Bacup
List of works by Sharpe and Paley

References

Bacup, Christ Church
Bacup, Christ Church
Churches completed in 1854
19th-century Church of England church buildings
Gothic Revival church buildings in England
Bacup, Christ Church
Bacup, Christ Church
Bacup, Christ Church
Bacup, Christ Church
1854 establishments in England